Webster Campbell (January 25, 1893 – August 28, 1972) was an American silent film actor, director, and screenwriter. He began screenwriting in 1913 and became an actor in 1915. He became primarily a director in 1921. By 1936, he retired and wrote short stories.

Partial filmography
Drawing the Line (1915)
The Evil Eye (1917)
 The Fettered Woman (1917)
 The Tower of Jewels (1919)
Babs (1920)
 Human Collateral (1920)
 The Sea Rider (1920)
The Pleasure Seekers (1920)
 What's Your Reputation Worth? (1921)
 It Isn't Being Done This Season (1921) 
 Moral Fibre (1921)
 Divorce Coupons (1922)
The Single Track (1921) (director)
Island Wives (1922) (director)
The Pace That Thrills (1925) (director)
The Love Racket (1929)
In the Next Room (1930)

References

External links

1893 births
1972 deaths
American male film actors
American male silent film actors
People from Kansas City, Kansas
Male actors from Kansas
20th-century American male actors
Film directors from Kansas